This is a list of all tornadoes reported in the US state of Rhode Island. Although tornadoes are very rare in this state, around 20 have been recorded in modern history. Additionally, because of high population density and property values, Rhode Island ranks 5th among states in potential losses due to tornadoes.

Tornadoes
August 15, 1787: A part of the Four-State Tornado Swarm of 1787, a tornado moved into the state from Windham County, Connecticut and tore the roofs from some homes in Glocester before passing into Massachusetts.
August 30, 1838: A major tornado, possibly the worst in Rhode Island history, passed south of Providence. It uprooted and stripped trees of their branches, unroofed or destroyed many houses, and sucked water out of ponds. The tornado barely missed a local railroad depot, where many people were waiting for a train. Five people were injured by the tornado.
August 25, 1882: A tornado damaged two barns and destroyed many trees in Johnston.

September 14, 1972: A weak F0 tornado hit east of Newport.
August 26, 1985: An F1 tornado passed from Connecticut into rural North Foster, causing no reported damage to structures.
August 7, 1986: The first multiple-tornado day recorded in Rhode Island history.  A weak F1 tornado briefly touched down near Lincoln around 3:30 PM local time.  At approximately 4:30pm a tornado destroyed a home at 43 Hillwood St, Providence owned by Lynn Panchuk Price.  It stayed on the ground for 4 miles (6 km), injuring 20 people and causing around $2.5 million in damage.
August 8, 1986: Another tornado struck the state again on this day.  Touching down at the unusual time of 9:30 AM north of Bridgeton, it continued on the ground for more than 6 miles (9 km) before passing into Massachusetts near North Smithfield.  Three people were injured by this F1 tornado.
September 23, 1989: An F0 tornado caused minor damage in Cranston.
October 18, 1990: An F1 touched down in Warwick, crossed Narragansett Bay as a waterspout, and dissipated in Riverside.
August 13, 1994: A small tornado damaged trees along a one-mile path in Coventry.
August 16, 2000: A very minor F0 tornado damaged a few trees along a 50-foot path in Foster.
July 23, 2008: A waterspout moved onshore as a low-end EF1 tornado in Warren, moving east-northeast into Massachusetts.
August 10, 2012: A waterspout moved onshore on the southern end of Block Island, moving north across the whole length of the island. Minor EF0 damage to trees and homes was reported.
October 23, 2018: An EF1 tornado struck Lincoln around 3:30 local time, causing damage to trees and homes, an EF0 tornado struck neighboring North Providence causing damage to mostly trees. Other waterspouts were reported across the state, though they did not cause any reported damage. No injurers were reported. This small outbreak continued across New England with tornados reported in Norton and other Massachusetts towns.
October 2, 2019: An EF0 tornado hit Portsmouth and lasted for 2 minutes. It caused damage to a few trees and a garage.
November 13, 2021: Two EF0 tornadoes and one EF1  struck the state. This was the first multiple tornado outbreak since 1986, and the first recorded tornado occurrence in the state in the month of November. The first touched down in North Stonington, CT and crossed over into Westerly at approximately 5pm with 90mph winds. The second struck North Kingstown with 80mph winds. The third touched down in Plainfield, CT and crossed over into Foster at approximately 5:02PM with 80mph winds.

See also
Enhanced Fujita Scale
Fujita scale
List of tornadoes and tornado outbreaks

References

External links
Rhode Island Tornadoes
Rhode Island Tornadoes at Tornado Project
Map of Rhode Island Tornadoes from 1950-present

 
Lists of tornadoes in the United States
Tornadoes